Constant Warwick was a 32-gun privateer, built in 1645 as a private venture between the Earl of Warwick and Sir William Batten. Hired for service in the Parliamentarian navy during the First English Civil War, her captain William Batten defected to the Royalists during the 1648 Second English Civil War. After her crew mutinied in November 1648, she returned to England and was purchased by Parliament on 20 January 1649. Described as an "incomparable sailer", she was noted for her sharpness and fine lines, and is considered by some as the first true frigate of the Royal Navy. Mainly used for patrolling, she was captured by the French in 1691.

Constant Warwick was the only ship of the Royal Navy to bear that name.

Construction and specifications
She was started as aprivate venture contracted to Peter Pett I of Ratcliffe and launched in 1645. Her tonnage was  tons. Her tonnage was  tons.

Her gun armament in 1653 and 1666 was 32 guns and consisted of twelve culverins on the lower deck (LD), twelve demi-culverins on the upper deck, ten sakers on the quarterdeck (QD).

She was completed with a first cost of £1,982.10.0d or 302 tons @ £6.10.0d per ton.

Description
Mr Samuel Pepys states, 

Research by William M. James states, 

James continues,

Commissioned service

English Civil War and Commonwealth Navy
She was commissioned in 1645 under Captain John Gilson, who would hold command in to 1647. In April 1647 she sided with the Royalists, however, in November she defected to the Parliamentary Navy. In November 1647 she was under command of Captain Robert Dare. In 1649 she was under Captain Robert Moulton Jr. She captured the Royalist ship Charles in May 1649. The Charles was incorporated into the Parliament Navy as the Guinea. Following the capture she was assigned to the blockade of Kinsale, Ireland. In 1650 she sailed with Robert Blake's Fleet to the Tagus for the blockade of Lisbon in 1650. She returned to Home Waters for service in the Irish Sea in 1651. In 1651 she came under the command of Captain Owen Cox.

First Anglo-Dutch War

Captain Cox sailed with Badiley's Squadron and participated in the Battle of Montecristo on 28 August 1652. In 1653 she was under Captain Upshott with Appleton's Squadron at the Battle of Leghorne on 4 March 1653. Later in 1653 she was under Captain Richard Potter until 1656 for service in Home Waters. She was off the Dutch coast during the winter of 1653/54.

In 1657 She was under the command of Captain Robert Vessey.

After the Restoration May 1660
Under Captain Vessey she was at Plymouth in June 1660. On 1 June 1661 she was under command of Captain Robert Kirby until 1 August 1663. She sailed to Tangier in 1662. She returned to Portsmouth and was laid up from 1663 until 166 when it was decided to rebuild her.

Rebuild at Portsmouth 1664-66
She was ordered rebuilt in April 1664 at Portsmouth Dockyard under the guidance of Master Shipwright John Tippets. She was taken in hand in early 1666 and launched on 21 April 1666. Her tonnage was  tons.Lavery, Ships of the Line vol. 1, p. 161.

Her gun armament in 1666 was 32 guns and consisted of twelve culverins on the lower deck (LD), twelve demi-culverins on the upper deck, ten sakers on the quarterdeck (QD). In 1677 her guns were changed to 42 wartime and 36 peacetime consisting of twenty demi culverins on the lower deck (LD), eighteen sakers on the upper deck (UD) and four sakers on the quarterdeck (QD). In 1685 she had eighteen demi-culverins drakes on the lower deck, eighteen 6-pounder guns on the upper deck and four 3-pounder guns on the quarterdeck.

Service after Rebuild Portsmouth 1664-66

She was commissioned on 21 June 1666 under the command of Robert Ensome. She was in action against a Dutch privateer off the River Tagus near Lisbon in February 1667. Captain Ensome was mortally wounded during the action and died on the 24th of February. On 3 April 1667, Captain Arthur Herbert took command until 5 September 1668. On 1 April 1669 Captain John Waterworth took command and sailed with Sir Thomas Aliin's Squadron to the Mediterranean. Captain Waterworth remained in command until 28 January 1672.

Third Anglo-Dutch War
With the start of the Third Anglo-Dutch War she came under command of Captain Thomas Hamilton on 10 April 1672. She partook in both battles of Schooneveld as a member of Red Squadron on 28 May (first) and 4 June (second) 1672.Winfield 5 Captain Count (Gustavus) Home took command on 24 June 1672 followed by Captain Joseph Harris on 2 June 1673. She was at the Battle of Texel on 11 August 1673.

With the end of the Third Anglo-Dutch War she sailed on a expedition to Cadiz then on to Guinea in 1674. On 9 April 1677 Captain Ralph Dalavall went to Barbados and returned to pay on 18 July 1679. She was activated on 8 April 1680 under Captain John Ashby for service in the English Channel. Captain Henry Williams took command on 6 May 1682 for service in Home Waters then for a convoy to Newfoundland in 1683 followed by service to the Mediterranean in 1684. Captain Charles Skelton took command on 10 July 1686 as guardship at Portsmouth, then sailed with Dartmouth's Fleet in 1688. In 1689 she was under Captain George Byng and later under Captain Abraham Potter. In 1690 she was under Captain John Beverley. She participated in the Battle of Beachy Head as a member of Red Squadron on 30 June 1690. She was reduced to a Fifth Rate vessel in 1691. She recommissioned in 1691 under Captain James Moodie and sailed with a convoy for the West Indies.

Loss
She was captured on 12 July 1691 off Portugal by a French squadron.

List of captains
 Captain Robert Ensom: 7/6/1666 - 24/2/1667
 Captain Arthur Herbert: 3/4./1667 - 5/9/1668
 Captain John Waterworth: 1/4/1669 - 28/1/1671/72
 Captain Thomas Hamilton: 10/4/1672 - 23/6/1672
 Captain Gustavus Horne: 24.6.1672 - 1.6.1673
 Captain Joseph Harris: 2/6/1673 - 27/7/1674
 Captain Ralph Delavall 9/4/1677 - 18/7/1679
 Captain John Ashby: 8/4/1680 - 5/5/1682
 Captain Henry Williams: 6/5/1682 - 9/9/1684
 Captain Charles Skelton: 10/7/1686 - 1688
 Captain George Byng: 1689
 Captain Abraham Potter: 1689 - 1690
 Captain John Beverley: 1690 - 1691
 Captain James Moody: 31/8/1690 - 12/7/1691

Notes

Citations

References

 Lavery, Brian (2003) The Ship of the Line - Volume 1: The development of the battlefleet 1650-1850.'' Conway Maritime Press. .
 British Warships in the Age of Sail (1603 – 1714), by Rif Winfield, published by Seaforth Publishing, England © Rif Winfield 2009, EPUB :
 Fleet Actions, 1.2 Battle of Montecristo
 Fleet Actions, 1.6 Battle off Livorno (Leghorne)
 Fleet Actions, 1.8 Battle of Scheveningen (off Texel)
 Fleet Actions, 5.3 First Battle of Shooneveld
 Fleet Actions, 5.4 Second Battle of Schooneveld
 Fleet Actions, 6.2 Battle of Beachy Head
 Chapter 4, The Fourth Rates - 'Small Ships', Vessels acquired from 24 March 1603, Constant Warwick
 Chapter 4, The Fourth Rates - 'Small Ships', Vessels acquired from 2 May 1660, Rebuilt Vessels (1663-66), Constant Warwick
 Ships of the Royal Navy, by J.J. Colledge, revised and updated by Lt-Cdr Ben Warlow and Steve Bush, published by Seaforth Publishing, Barnsley, Great Britain, © the estate of J.J. Colledge, Ben Warlow and Steve Bush 2020, EPUB , Section C (Constant Warwick)
 The Arming and Fitting of English Ships of War 1600 - 1815, by Brian Lavery, published by US Naval Institute Press © Brian Lavery 1989, Part V Guns, Type of Guns

Ships of the line of the Royal Navy
Ships built in Ratcliff
1640s ships
Ships built in Portsmouth
Captured ships